Ruslan Mezentsev (also written Myezyentsev; born 24 June 1981) is a Ukrainian gymnast. He competed at the 2000 Summer Olympics and the 2004 Summer Olympics, winning a silver medal at the 2000 Olympics.

References

External links
 

1981 births
Living people
Ukrainian male artistic gymnasts
Olympic gymnasts of Ukraine
Gymnasts at the 2000 Summer Olympics
Gymnasts at the 2004 Summer Olympics
Sportspeople from Kropyvnytskyi
Medalists at the 2000 Summer Olympics
Olympic medalists in gymnastics
Olympic silver medalists for Ukraine
21st-century Ukrainian people